Shabd is a 2005 Indian Hindi-language psychological thriller film produced by Pritish Nandy Communications, and directed by Leena Yadav. It stars Sanjay Dutt, Aishwarya Rai and Zayed Khan. The film got good reviews but performed below expectations at the box office, despite being profitable. The story is adapted from the critically acclaimed Malayalam film Rachana released in 1983.

Plot 
Author Shaukat Vashisht lives a wealthy lifestyle in India with his wife, Antra, who is a lecturer. Shaukat achieves fame when he is nominated for the Booker prize, and goes on to win it. His publishers, hoping that they have unleashed a goldmine, are disappointed with his subsequent works, and soon Shaukat is depressed to such an extent that he almost gives up writing. Then he decides to write a story on a woman named Tamanna, and figures that he will base this story on none other than Antara herself. For this purpose he starts to make note of her every movement, and it is then that he finds out that she has an admirer in fellow-teacher, Yash Agnihotri, a dashing young man with a bright future ahead of him. Shaukat also finds out that Antara has never mentioned Yash to him, nor has she informed Yash that she is married.

He decides to manufacture a realistic story by making Antara hide her marital status from Yash and pursue a relationship with him. Things go wrong as Antara begins to have real feelings for Yash, even though she still loves Shaukat.

Whatever Shaukat pens turns out to be true. He starts to believe he can change Antara's and Yash's fate by his writings, and writes according to his logic that Yash would commit suicide after learning the truth about Antara's. But, Antara soon discovers this. She lies to Shaukat that Yash really committed suicide in order to disillusion Shaukat. Shaukat, out of guilt, becomes schizophrenic. The film ends on a disturbing note: Antara sends Shaukat to an asylum, due to his schizophrenia.

Cast 
 Sanjay Dutt as Shaukat Vashisth, a famous author who lives with his wife Antara and two servants.
 Aishwarya Rai as Antara Vashisth/Tamanna, Shaukat's wife and a college teacher (dual role)
 Zayed Khan as Yash Agnihotri, a young college teacher who is in love with Antara.
 Aakash Pandey as Shouting asylum inmate
 Sadiya Siddiqui as Rajni (maidservant)
 Brijendra Kala as Servant (Ramakant)
 Alexander as the stranger
 Susheel Chhabra as Nerd
 Imram Hasnee as Asylum Doctor
 Kamini Khanna as Mrs. Kapadia
 Lalit Parashar as Mr. Bhargva
 Rucha Pathak as Publisher's assistant

Music 

The music of the film did get good reviews among audiences, though the film overall performed well below expectations at the box office. All Songs Composed By Vishal-Shekhar and lyrics penned by Irshad Kamil The film had the following soundtrack.

External links
 
 Leena Yadav's Interview

2005 films
2000s Hindi-language films
Films scored by Vishal–Shekhar
Films directed by Leena Yadav
Indian psychological drama films
Indian psychological thriller films
Films about books
Extramarital relationships
Indian drama films
Indian thriller drama films
2000s thriller drama films